WIOL-FM (95.7 FM, "95.7 ESPN") is a radio station broadcasting a sports format. Licensed to Waverly Hall, Georgia, United States, the station serves the Columbus, Georgia, area.  The station is owned by Davis Broadcasting of Columbus, Inc. and features programming from ESPN Radio.  Its studios are co-located with four other sister stations on Wynnton Road in Columbus east of downtown, and its transmitter is located in Waverly Hall.

History
The station was assigned the call letters WKZJ on 1993-09-15.  On 30 March 2005, the station changed its call sign to the current WIOL-FM.

WIOL changed format from Classic Hits to Hot AC in late 2007, and changed the station moniker from Classic Hits 95-7 The River to the New Mix 95-7. On October 16, 2009, WIOL changed format to sports talk and carries the simulcast of WIOL 1580 AM.

Previous Logos

References

External links

IOL
Radio stations established in 1994
Sports radio stations in the United States
ESPN Radio stations
1993 establishments in Georgia (U.S. state)